NGC 273 is an edge-on lenticular galaxy in the constellation Cetus. It was discovered on September 10, 1785 by William Herschel.

References

External links
 

17850910
Cetus (constellation)
0273
002959
Lenticular galaxies
Discoveries by William Herschel